Gaitskell may refer to:

Arthur Gaitskell (1900–1985), British colonial administrator
Dora Gaitskell, Baroness Gaitskell (1901–1989), British politician
Hugh Gaitskell (1906–1963), British politician; leader of the Labour party
Richard Gaitskell (born 1965), American physicist

See also
Gaskell
Gaitskill
Gaitskellism